Natal Drums (in past known as Natal Percussion Company) is a British musical instrument manufacturing company based in Bletchley, England. The name is a portmanteau of the first names of the company founder and his wife, NATalie and ALan.

In 2010 the company was purchased by Marshall Amplification. Current line of Natal products include drum kits, hardware, and other percussion instruments such as bongo drums, congas, tambourines, cowbells and bar chimes.

History
Natal was established in 1958, creating fibreglass Latin percussion that has been used by the likes of Led Zeppelin, The Rolling Stones and Santana.

Natal had great success in the late 1960s thanks to its revolutionary fiberglass congas that was used by bands like Santana, T. Rex, Led Zeppelin, Fleetwood Mac, Deep Purple and The Rolling Stones. In 2010, Natal was acquired by Marshall, which announced the purchase at the 2010 Musikmesse Exhibition.

Artists 
Some musicians that use/have used Natal drums are:

 Andy Treacey
 Ash Soan
 Blue Devils Drum and Bugle Corps
 Brian Downey
 Cass Browne
 Charlie Morgan
 Chris Turner
 Claudia "Killer" Lippmann
 Daniel Chantrey
 Daniel Schild
 Darrin Mooney
 Dhani Mansworth
 DJ Bonebrake
 Gary Walmsley
 Ian Matthews
 Jack Stephens
 Jamiel Blake
 Jano Rix
 John Coghlan 
 Julien Audigier
 Louise Bartle
 Martin "Frosty" Beedle (Cutting Crew, Lifesigns)
 Martin Osborne (Shadow Warriors)
 Martin Ranscombe
 Matt Brobin
 Matt Donnelly
 Mohktar Samba
 Nate Arling
 Nick Kilroe
 Pascal Bianco
 Paul Hose
 Raymond Hearne
 Richard Kensington
 Ritch Battersby
 Robb Reiner
 Russell Gilbrook
 Sean Moore
 Steve Grantley
 Sudha Kheterpal
 Swiss Chris
 The Peggies

References

External links
 

Percussion instrument manufacturing companies
Musical instrument manufacturing companies of the United Kingdom
Companies based in Milton Keynes